Davenport Airport , also known as Davenport Municipal Airport, is a city-owned, public-use airport located one nautical mile (2 km) west of the central business district of Davenport, a city in Lincoln County, Washington, United States. It is included in the National Plan of Integrated Airport Systems for 2011–2015, which categorized it as a general aviation facility.

Facilities and aircraft 
Davenport Airport covers an area of 35 acres (14 ha) at an elevation of 2,421 feet (738 m) above mean sea level. It has one runway. Runway 5/23 is 2,747 by 50 feet (837 x 15 m) with an asphalt surface. It also has an additional runway that was closed by the FAA and is not maintained. This runway, runway 3/21, is 2,271 by 45 feet (692 x 14 m) with a gravel surface.

For the 12-month period ending June 28, 2010, the airport had 7,000 general aviation aircraft operations, an average of 19 per day. At that time there were 13 aircraft based at this airport: 85% single-engine and 15% ultralight.

References

External links 
 Aerial image as of July 1991 from USGS The National Map

Airports in Washington (state)
Transportation buildings and structures in Lincoln County, Washington